Preacher is an American television series developed by Sam Catlin, Evan Goldberg, and Seth Rogen for AMC starring Dominic Cooper. It is based on the comic book series Preacher created by Garth Ennis and Steve Dillon, and published by DC Comics' Vertigo imprint. The series was officially picked up on September 9, 2015, with a ten-episode order which premiered on May 22, 2016.

Series overview

Episodes

Season 1 (2016)

Season 2 (2017)

Season 3 (2018)

Season 4 (2019)

Ratings

Season 1

Season 2

Season 3

Season 4

Overview

Notes

References

External links
 

Lists of American drama television series episodes
Lists of horror television series episodes
Lists of American supernatural television series episodes
Preacher (TV series) episodes